Tamara Lasjkarasjvili (1916-2001) was a Soviet-Georgian Politician (Communist).

She served as Minister of Education from 1960 to 1976.

References

1916 births
1986 deaths
20th-century women politicians from Georgia (country)
20th-century politicians from Georgia (country)
Soviet women in politics
Communists from Georgia (country)
Women government ministers of Georgia (country)